Roberts Lake is a reservoir at 5010 Roberts Lake Road in Rohnert Park, California, USA. Named after Arthur N. Roberts, a five-term mayor who died in 1986, it is the centerpiece of Roberts Lake Park, a city park.

The lake is the site of an annual free fishing derby for children fifteen years and under.  Fish species found in the lake include rainbow trout, bluegill, crappie, channel catfish, carp, and largemouth bass.

See also
List of dams and reservoirs in California
List of lakes in California
List of lakes in the San Francisco Bay Area

References

Reservoirs in Sonoma County, California
Rohnert Park, California
Reservoirs in California
Reservoirs in Northern California